Alfred Paget Hedges (30 December 1867 – 17 April 1929), was a British Liberal Party politician and cigarette manufacturer.

Background
He was the second son of William Hedges of Ealing, the co-founder of Benson & Hedges Ltd. He was educated at Milton, Kent. He married Florence Hicks of Gerrans, Cornwall. They had three sons.  He was an ardent Methodist.

Business career
He succeeded his father in his tobacco business in 1885 and immediately became the sole proprietor. He had business connections in London, New York and Montreal.

Political career
He was Liberal MP for the Tunbridge Division of Kent from 1906 to 1910. He was elected at the first attempt, gaining the seat from the Conservatives at the 1906 General Election. On 18 February 1908, he instituted a debate on local taxation, and after extensive lobbying for the readjustment of taxes in the winter of 1908–9, he still voted against the government over rating reform in February 1909. He was defeated by the Conservatives at the following General Election in January 1910;

He served as a Justice of the Peace in Kent.

Sources
Who Was Who
British parliamentary election results 1885–1918, Craig, F. W. S.

References

External links 
Who Was Who
 Hedges on local taxation, hansard.milbanksystems.com. Accessed 1 December 2022.

1867 births
1929 deaths
Liberal Party (UK) MPs for English constituencies
UK MPs 1906–1910